Southern Bashkardi or Bashagerdi, or simply "Bashkardi", and also known as southern "Bashaka", is a Southwestern Iranian language spoken in the southeast of Iran in the provinces of Kerman, Sistan and Baluchestan, and Hormozgan. The language is closely related to Garmsiri, Larestani and Kumzari. It forms a transitional dialect group to northwestern Iranian Balochi, due to intense areal contact. 

Northern Bashkardi, or Marzi Gāl, is closer to neighbours than is Southern Bashkardi, or Molki Gāl, 
and has been classified as a dialect of the neighboring Garmsiri ( Bandari) language.

The Bashkardi varieties spoken further inland may not all fall into either Northern or Southern Bashkardi.

References

External links
 

Languages of Iran
Southwestern Iranian languages